The 2013 FIBA Intercontinental Cup was the 23rd edition of the FIBA Intercontinental Cup for men's professional basketball clubs and the 22nd edition of the tournament being in the form of a true intercontinental tournament for clubs. The 2 game aggregate score tournament took place at the Ginásio José Corrêa arena in Barueri, São Paulo, Brazil, on October 4 and October 6, 2013, in order to determine the world club champion. The tournament was contested between the 2012–13 season EuroLeague champions, Olympiacos, and the 2013 FIBA Americas League champions, Pinheiros Sky.

Series summary

Olympiacos won the series 2-0.

Game 1

Game 1 Box Score

Pinheiros Sky

Olympiacos

Starters are listed in bold.

Game 2

Game 2 Box Score

Olympiacos

Pinheiros Sky

Starters are listed in bold.

Rosters

MVP

 Vassilis Spanoulis - ( Olympiacos)

References

External links 
2013 Intercontinental Cup Official Site
2013 World Cup of Clubs
Euroleague.net Intercontinental Cup Game 1
Intercontinental Cup of Clubs Re-launched

 

2013 in basketball
2013
Sport in São Paulo (state)
International basketball competitions hosted by Brazil
2013–14 in Brazilian basketball
2013–14 in Greek basketball